Oost-Veluws (East Veluws) is one of the main dialects of Veluws and is therefore related to West-Veluws and Sallaans. It is spoken in the Dutch province Gelderland. The dialect is endangered as there are few native speakers left.

Delimitation of Oost-Veluws

Oost-Veluws is spoken in places such as the municipalities Elburg en Oldebroek, Epe, Vaassen, Apeldoorn en Dieren. The villages Elspeet, Uddel en Kootwijk in the middle of the Veluwe belong to West-Veluws.

The delimitation to Sallaans is problematic to the point that some linguists prefer to make a division between Veluws (consisting of West-Veluws and some Oost-Veluws places as Elburg and Oldebroek) and Sallaans (consisting of Sallaans and the rest of the Oost-Veluws region).

Differences to other dialect groups

Differences to West-Veluws 

Most villages of the area called Veluwe lie on its borders, that is, not in the middle of this sandy woodland. The actual Veluwe is a very sparsely populated area that was rather inaccessible in earlier days. Therefore, it is not surprising that two very important isoglosses have come to lie within the Veluwe.

The first isogloss is the border between old and olt on the Eastern side and the vocalization of l as in oud or out in the West. The retaining of ol is typical for Low German, while its replacement by ou is characteristic for Low Frankish.

The second isogloss pertains to the plural inflection of verbs. In most West Low German dialects, the plural inflection for all person forms is t: wiele warkt, ule warkt, zie warkt - 'we work, you work, they work'. West-Veluws has a unified plural inflection as well, but on -en as in Dutch. But in the South and East of the Veluwe, -t is restricted to the second and third person plural, while the first person takes -en. In the variety of Apeldoorn, for example, it is wiele warken, ule warkt, zie warkt.

There are also some lexical differences. For example, Oost-Veluws has ledder 'ladder', while in West-Veluws the form leer is used which is probably a loan from 17th century Hollandic. This process during which characteristics of Hollandic were adopted in places at the shore of the Zuiderzee, while the IJssel region retained the Low German forms holds also for the two isoglosses cited above.

Differences to Achterhoeks

But the intensive influence of Hollandic can be observed in Oost-Veluws as well as can be seen when comparing it to Achterhoeks dialect which lies in the East of the Veluwe. E.g. Achterhoeks good, beer, while Dutch and Veluws goed, bier. Germanic long ô as in *grônaz 'green becomes uu, thus gruun, in comparison to Achterhoeks greun. Here, Oost-Veluws patterns with Sallaans.

Dutch ui usually corresponds to Oost-Veluws uu, while (eastern) Achterhoeks has oe. In all of Sallaans and western Achterhoeks (as in Zutphens), lexical diffusion takes place, and words like huus/huis 'house' and moes/muis'' 'mouse' can both be heard.

References

Languages of the Netherlands
Dutch Low Saxon
Culture of Gelderland